This is an alphabetical list of composers from France.

A–B

 Eryck Abecassis (born 1956)
 Jean-Baptiste Accolay (1833–1900)
 Adolphe Adam (1803–1856)
 François d'Agincourt (1684–1758)
 Léopold Aimon (1779–1866)
 Jehan Alain (1911–1940)
 Paul Alday (c. 1763 – 1835)
 Charles-Valentin Alkan (1813–1888)
 Joseph-Henri Altès (1826–1895)
 Jean-Claude Amiot (born 1939)
 Gilbert Amy (born 1936)
 Édouard Ignace Andlauer (1830–1909)
 Jean-Henri d'Anglebert (1629–1691)
 Jean-Baptiste Arban (1825–1889)
 Daniel Auber (1782–1871)
 Jacques Aubert (1689–1753)
 Louis Aubert (1877–1968)
 Olivier Aubert (1763–c.1830)
 Tony Aubin (1907–1981)
 Edmond Audran (1840–1901)
 Georges Auric (1899–1983)
 Artus Aux-Cousteaux (c. 1590 – 1656)
 Nicolas Bacri (born 1961)
 Pierre Baillot (1771–1842)
 Claude Balbastre (1724–1799)
 Auguste Barbereau (1799–1879)
 Jean Barraqué (1928–1973)
 François Bazin (1816–1878)
 Désiré Beaulieu (1791–1863)
 Hector Berlioz (1803–1869)
 Louise Bertin (1805–1877)
 Christophe Bertrand (1981–2010)
 Henri Betti (1917–2005)
 Georges Bizet (1838–1875)
 Adolphe Blanc (1828–1885)
 Nicolas-Charles Bochsa (1789–1856)
 François-Adrien Boieldieu (1775–1834)
 Joseph Bodin de Boismortier (1689–1755)
 Michel Blavet (1700–1768)
 Léon Boëllmann (1862–1897)
 Claude Bolling (1930–2020)
 Mel Bonis (1858–1937)
 Charles Bordes (1863–1909)
 Lili Boulanger (1893–1918)
 Nadia Boulanger (1887–1979)
 Pierre Boulez (1925–2016)
 Joseph Boulogne, Chevalier de St George (1745–1799)
 Louis-Albert Bourgault-Ducoudray (1840–1910)
 Laurent Boutonnat (born 1961)
 Eugène Bozza (1905–1991)
 Jean-Baptiste Bréval (1753–1823)
 Antoine Brumel (1460 – 1515 ?)
 Clément Broutin (1851–1889)
 Alfred Bruneau (1857–1934)
 Henri Büsser (1872–1973)

C–D

 André Campra (1660–1744)
 Joseph Canteloube (1879–1957)
 André Caplet (1878–1925)
 Jacques Castérède (1926–2014)
 Alexis de Castillon (1838–1873)
 Charles Simon Catel (1773–1830)
 Pierre Certon (c.1510/20–1572)
 Emmanuel Chabrier (1841–1894)
 Cécile Chaminade (1857–1944)
 Jacques Champion de Chambonnières (c. 1601 – 1672)
 Gustave Charpentier (1860–1956)
 Marc-Antoine Charpentier (1643–1704)
 Ernest Chausson (1855–1899)
 Charles-Alexis Chauvet (1837–1871)
 Nicolas Chedeville (1705–1782)
 Hedwige Chrétien (1859–1944)
 Aloÿs Claussmann (1850–1926)
 Louis-Nicolas Clérambault (1676–1749)
 Michel Colombier (1939-2004)
 Loÿset Compère (c. 1445 – 1518)
 Napoléon Coste (1805–1883)
 Bruno Coulais (born 1954)
 François Couperin (1668–1733)
 Louis Couperin (c. 1626 – 1661)
 Jean Cras (1879–1932)
 Ferdinand de Craywinckel (1820 – c. 1888)
 Nicolas Dalayrac (1753–1809)
 Jean-Michel Damase (1928–2013)
 Jules Danbé (1840–1905)
 Charles Dancla (1817–1907)
 Jean-François Dandrieu (c. 1682 – 1738)
 Jean-Henri d'Anglebert (1629–1691)
 Adolphe Danhauser (1835–1896)
 Louis-Claude Daquin (1694–1772)
 Félicien David (1810–1876)
 Claude Debussy (1862–1918)
 Louis Deffès (1819–1900)
 Michel Richard Delalande (1657–1726)
 Georges Delerue (1925–1992)
 Léo Delibes (1836–1891)
 Charles Delioux (1825–1915)
 Jeanne Demessieux (1921–1968)
 Alfred Desenclos (1912–1971)
 Adolphe Deslandres (1840–1911)
 Alexandre Desplat (born 1961)
 Louis Diémer (1843–1919)
 Victor Dourlen (1780–1864)
 Théodore Dubois (1837–1924)
 François Dufault (before 1604–c.1672)
 Guillaume Dufay (c. 1397 – 1474)
 Maurice Duhamel (1884–1940)
 Paul Dukas (1865–1935)
 Henri Duparc (1848–1933)
 Gabriel Dupont (1878–1914)
 Jean-Louis Duport (1749–1819)
 Jean-Pierre Duport (1741–1818)
 Marcel Dupré (1886–1971)
 Émile Durand (1830–1903)
 Joël-François Durand (born 1954)
 Louis Durey (1888–1979)
Marie-Madeleine Duruflé (1921-1999)
 Maurice Duruflé (1902–1986)
 Pascal Dusapin (born 1955)
 Henri Dutilleux (1916–2013)
 Hugues Dufourt (born 1943)
 Jean-Baptiste Duvernoy (c. 1802 – c. 1880)

E–G

 André-Joseph Exaudet (1710–1762)
 Ernest Fanelli (1860–1917)
 Louise Farrenc (1804–1875)
 Gabriel Fauré (1845–1924)
 Antoine Forqueray (1671–1745)
 Jean Françaix (1912–1997)
 César Franck (1822–1890)
 Raymond Gallois-Montbrun (1918–1994)
 Jacques Gallot (c. 1625 – c. 1695)
 Pedro Garcia-Velasquez (born 1984)
 Denis Gaultier (1603–1672)
 André Gedalge (1856–1926)
 Henri Ghys (1839–1908)
 Benjamin Godard (1849–1895)
 Nicolas Gombert (c. 1495 – c. 1560)
 François Joseph Gossec (1734–1829)
 Charles Gounod (1818–1893)
 Théodore Gouvy (1819–1898)
 Jacques de Gouy (c.1610–after 1650)
 Nicolas de Grigny (1672–1703)
 Gérard Grisey (1946–1998)
 Gabriel Grovlez (1879–1944)
 Louis-Gabriel Guillemain (1705–1770)
 Jean Guillou (1930–2019)
 Alexandre Guilmant (1837–1911)

H–K

 Reynaldo Hahn (1874–1947)
 Fromental Halévy (1799–1862)
 Charles-Louis Hanon (1819–1900)
 Guy d'Hardelot (1858–1936)
 Lucien Haudebert (1877–1963)
 Pierre Henry (1927–2017)
 Ferdinand Hérold (1791–1833)
 Louis de Caix d'Hervelois (c. 1670 – c. 1760)
 Augusta Holmès (1847–1903)
 Arthur Honegger (1892–1955)
 Jacques-Martin Hotteterre (1674–1763)
 Jean Huré (1877–1930)
 Jacques Ibert (1890–1962)
 Vincent d'Indy (1851–1931)
 H. Maurice Jacquet (1886-1954)
 Hyacinthe Jadin (1776–1800)
 Louis-Emmanuel Jadin (1768–1853)
 Jean Michel Jarre (born 1948)
 Maurice Jarre (1924–2009)
 André Jolivet (1905–1974)
 Maurice Journeau (1898–1999)
 Louis Antoine Jullien (1812–1860)
 Cyprien Katsaris (born 1951)
 Eugène Ketterer (1831–1870)
 Charles Koechlin (1867–1950)
 Joseph-François Kremer (born 1954)
 Léon Charles François Kreutzer (1817—1868) 
 Rodolphe Kreutzer (1766–1831)

L

 Élisabeth Jacquet de La Guerre (1665–1729)
 Sophie Lacaze (born 1963)
 Théodore Lack (1846–1921)
 Louis Lacombe (1818–1884)
 Paul Ladmirault (1877–1944)
 Édouard Lalo (1823–1892)
 Michel Lambert (1610–1696)
 Georges Lamothe (1842–1894)
 Jean Langlais (1907–1991)
 Marcel Lanquetuit (1894–1985)
 Christian Lauba (born 1952)
 Jean-François Le Sueur (1760–1837)
 Nicolas Lebègue (c. 1631 – 1702), also "Le Bègue"
 Jean-Marie Leclair (1697–1764)
 Jean-Marie Leclair the younger (1703–1777)
 Louis James Alfred Lefébure-Wély (1817–1869)
 Paul Le Flem (1881–1984)
 Michel Legrand (1932–2019)
 Jean-Pierre Leguay (born 1939)
 Jacques Leguerney (1906–1997)
 Jean-Baptiste Lemire (1867–1945)
 Leonin (1150s-c.1201)
 Fabien Lévy (born 1968)
 Gaston Litaize (1909–1991)
 Jean-Baptiste Lully (1632–1687)

M–N

 Guillaume de Machaut (c. 1300 – 1377)
 Albéric Magnard (1865–1914)
 Jean-Yves Malmasson (born 1963)
 Pierre de Manchicourt (c. 1510 – 1564)
 Édouard Mangin (1837–1907)
 Marin Marais (1656–1728)
 Louis Marchand (1669–1732)
 Victor Massé (1822–1884)
 Jules Massenet (1842–1912)
 Paule Maurice (1910–1967)
 Jacques Féréol Mazas (1782–1849)
 Jules Mazellier (1879–1959)
 Stephane Meer (born 1951)
 Étienne Méhul (1763–1817)
 Félicien Menu de Ménil (1860–1930)
 Max Méreaux (born 1946)
 Olivier Messiaen (1908–1992)
 Jean-Christian Michel (born 1938)
 Darius Milhaud (1892–1974)
 Jean-Joseph de Mondonville (1711–1772)
 Jacques-Louis Monod (born 1927)
 Michel Pignolet de Montéclair (1667–1737)
 Léon Moreau (1870–1946)
 Pierre Montan Berton (1727–1780)
 Étienne Moulinié (1599–1667)
 Jean-Joseph Mouret (1682–1738)
 Jean Mouton (c. 1459 – 1522)
 Tristan Murail (born 1947)
 François Joseph Naderman (1781–1835)

O–P

 Jacques Offenbach (1819–1880)
 Joseph O'Kelly (1828–1885)
 André George Louis Onslow (1784–1853)
 Émile Paladilhe (1844–1926)
 Paul Paray (1886–1979)
 Jean-Louis Petit (born 1937)
 Ninot le Petit (fl. c.1500–1520)
 Georges Pfeiffer (1835–1908)
 François-André Danican Philidor (1726–1795)
 Gabriel Pierné (1863–1937)
 Auguste Pilati (1810–1877)
 Francis Poulenc (1899–1963)
 Jacques de la Presle (1888–1969)
 Josquin des Prez (c. 1450 – 1521)
 Pierre Pincemaille (1956–2018)

R–S

 Jean-Philippe Rameau (1683–1764)  
 Jean-Marie Raoul (1766–1837)
 Maurice Ravel (1875–1937)
 Jean-Henri Ravina (1818–1906)
 Jean-Féry Rebel (1666–1747)
 Rhené-Baton (1879–1940)
 Jean-Claude Risset (born 1936)
 Théodore Ritter (1840–1887)
 Pierre Rode (1774–1830)
 Joseph Guy Ropartz (1864–1955)
 Claude Joseph Rouget de Lisle (1760–1836)
 Jean-Jacques Rousseau (1712–1778)
 Albert Roussel (1869–1937)
 Joseph-Nicolas-Pancrace Royer (c. 1705 – 1755)
 F. Rubinet (fl 1482–1507)
 Pierre de La Rue (c. 1452 – 1518)
 Monsieur de Sainte-Colombe (c. 1640 – c. 1700)
 Camille Saint-Saëns (1835–1921)
 Gustave Samazeuilh (1877–1967)
 Pierre Sancan (1916–2008)
 Erik Satie (1866–1925)
 Henri Sauguet (1901–1989)
 Alice Sauvrezis (1866–1946)
 Charles Eugène Sauzay (1809–1901)
 Pierre Schaeffer (1910–1995)
 Florent Schmitt (1870–1958)
 Claudin de Sermisy (c. 1490 – 1562)
 Gaston Serpette (1846–1904)
 Éric Serra (born 1959)
 Déodat de Séverac (1872–1921)

T–Y

 Walter Taieb (born 1973)
 Germaine Tailleferre (1892–1983)
 Alexandre Tansman (1897–1986)
 Claude Terrasse (1867–1923)
 Ambroise Thomas (1811–1896)
 Charles Tournemire (1870–1939)
 Edgard Varèse (1883–1965)
 Pauline Viardot (1821–1910)
 Louis Vierne (1870–1937)
 Robert de Visée (c. 1655 – 1732–33)
 Louis Vuillemin (1879–1929)
 Charles-Marie Widor (1844–1937)
 Jules Auguste Wiernsberger (1857–1925)
 Michèl Yost (1754–1786)

References

See also

 List of French classical composers (chronological)
 Lists of composers

 
French
Composers
French music-related lists